Urticarial dermatoses are distinct from urticaria, which examples being drug-induced urticaria, eosinophilic cellulitis and bullous pemphigoid.  It is important to distinguish urticaria from urticarial dermatoses.  The individual wheals of urticaria are ‘here today and gone tomorrow’ (i.e. they last less than 24 hours), whereas with urticarial dermatoses, the individual lesions last for days or longer.

See also 
 Urticaria
 List of cutaneous conditions

References